Dermot or Diarmuid Murphy may refer to:

Dermot Murphy (actor)
Dermot Murphy (rugby union) in 2010 end-of-year rugby union tests
Diarmuid Murphy (born 1975), Gaelic footballer
Diarmuid Murphy (writer) (1895–1966), Irish writer, theatre and film producer